Stephen John Howard (born 7 February 1949 in Launceston, Tasmania) is a former Australian cricketer, who played for Tasmania. His career was from 1969 until 1980.

His batting style was right-hand bat and his bowling style was right-arm medium.

Howard debuted for Tasmania in a limited overs match against Victoria in late November 1969 and scored 39 not out, winning the Man of the Match award. His first-class debut came a month later when Tasmania played a New Zealand XI in Hobart.

Stephen Howard's sole first-class century was scored for Tasmania during a match against New South Wales in Hobart during the 1976–77 season. He was an opening batsman for the Tasmanian team which won the Gillette Cup in 1978–79.

Howard also played senior football with City-South in the NTFA during the late 1960s.

See also
 List of Tasmanian representative cricketers

References

External links
Cricket Archive

 

1949 births
Living people
Australian cricketers
Tasmania cricketers
Cricketers from Launceston, Tasmania